The Akhshtyrskaya cave (Big Kazachebrodskaya) is a notable archeological site in the Western Caucasus. It is located on the right side of Akhshtyrskaya gorge of the Mzymta River near the Adlersky City District of Sochi, Krasnodar Krai, Russia. It was discovered in September 1903 by Edouard Martel and Gabriel Revinko, a resident of the nearby village of Kazachy Brod. The cave is named after the local village of Akhshtyr and the alternative name after the village of Kazachy Brod.

Description 
Further on there is a sharp rise of clay, and two narrow courses coming to a dead end.

The cave received the status of "a unique monument of prehistoric architecture". In 1978 the entrance to the cave was closed and the hallway blocked by iron bars. In 1999 the cave became accessible to the public and is equipped with artificial lighting, stairs and steps.

Discovery and excavations 
The Akhshtyrskaya Cave was discovered in September 1903 by Édouard-Alfred Martel and Gabriel Revinko, a resident of the nearby village of Kazachy Brod. In 1936, archaeologist Sergei Nikolayevich Zamyatin excavated the first prehistoric human remains. From 1961 to 1965 excavations resumed by archaeologists MZ Panichkina and EA Vekilova. The stratigraphic sequence is about 5 meters thick and ranges from the Middle Paleolithic era to the early Medieval period. More recent excavations occurred from 1999 until 2008. In total, more than 6,000 bones were found - 92% of which belonged to the cave bear. In addition, there are the remains of deer, bison, goats, wolves, foxes and other animals. Humans - Neanderthals  settled in the cave about 70,000 years ago. After a break of about 20,000 years the cave was populated by Cro-Magnon humans between 30,000 and 35,000 years ago.

Results 

Layer Dating: Layer 3/1: 40,000 yrs BC; Layer 4/1: 70,000 yrs BC; Layer 4/2: 80,000 yrs BC;  Layer 5/1: 112,000 yrs BC; Layer 5/2: 200,000 yrs BC; Layer 6/1: 250,000 yrs BC; Layer 6/2: 270,000 yrs BC; Layer 7: 300,000 yrs BC; Layer 8: 300,000 yrs BC; Layer 9: 350,000 BC

Description and findings 

Finding (2005): Mandible of cave bear; hip bone of cave bear; radius; humerus; cervical vertebrae; rib; vertebrae; lumbar vertebrae; thoracic vertebrae

Excavation (2005): Level 3 M Mousterian. This level is associated with Neanderthal culture at about 40,000 BC. Some cave bear relics were found.   Black spots inside the levels of the cave may be the result of fire usage for cooking and warming. Scientists also found tools: knives, spears and axes.

Section (2005): Rock bottom of the cave. Starting about 350,000 years ago. Layer 9: 350,000 BC; Layer 8: 350,000-300,000 BC; The cave was not habitable and was filled with water. Layer 6/2, 6/1: About 250,000 years BC. Tools were found showing Neanderthal habitation; Layer 5/2, 5/1: 112,000 years BC. First level of long-term habitation of Neanderthal people. Layer: 4/2, 4/1: 70,000 years BC. Second level of long-term habitation of Neanderthal people. Layer 3: 40,000 years BC. Late Paleolithic. Stone object of possible Cro-Magnon culture.

Gallery 
Photographs of the cave and immediate area

References 

 VI Borisov. Реки Кубани. - Krasnodar : Kubánskoye knizhnoye izdatelstvo, 2005 . - 120 pp.
 SA Kulakov. О плане музеефикации Ахштырской пещерной стоянки. - 3-я Кубанская археологическая конференция: Краснодар-Анапа, 2001. - pp 70–74..
 SA Kulakov, Baryshinkov GF, GM Levkovskaya. Некоторые результаты нового изучения Ахштырской пещерной стоянки (Западный Кавказ). Кавказ и первоначальное заселение человеком Старого Света. - St. Petersburg : Peterburgskoye Vostovedeniye, 2007, pp. 65–81.
 BR Mavliukov, IA Kusi. Черноморское побережье Кавказа от Туапсе до Адлера: путеводитель. - Simon-Press, 2000 . - 272 p. -

External links 
 
 Secrets Ahshtyrskaya cave
 Magnetic, paleomagnetic and palynologic studies of Paleolithic depositions of the Akhshtyrskaya Cave (Russia)

1903 archaeological discoveries
Caves of Russia
Landforms of Krasnodar Krai
Archaeological sites in Russia
Tourist attractions in Krasnodar Krai
Natural monuments of Russia
Mousterian
Neanderthal sites
Cultural heritage monuments of federal significance in Krasnodar Krai